Robert Surcouf de Maisonneuve (4 January 1671 – c. 1720) was a Breton privateer.

Career 
Born in Saint-Malo, Surcouf de Maisonneuve captained the privateer Aimable under the reign of Louis XIV.

Legacy 
Amongst the descendants of Surcouf de Maisonneuve were Robert Surcouf and Joseph Potier.

Notes and references

Notes

References

Bibliography 
 

French privateers
French sailors
1671 births
1720s deaths
People from Saint-Malo
18th-century Breton people